Defending champion Venus Williams defeated her sister Serena Williams in the final, 7–5, 6–4 to win the ladies' singles tennis title at the 2008 Wimbledon Championships. It was her fifth Wimbledon title and seventh major singles title overall. She won the title without losing a set, the second time she did so at a major. The sisters also won the doubles title playing together.

Ana Ivanovic, Jelena Janković, Maria Sharapova and Svetlana Kuznetsova were in contention for the WTA No. 1 ranking. Ivanovic retained the top ranking despite losing in the third round to Zheng Jie. Janković, Sharapova and Kuznetsova also lost in the first four rounds, marked the first time in Wimbledon history that none of the top four women's seeds advanced to the quarterfinals.

Zheng went on to reach the semifinals, becoming the first Chinese player to do so at a singles major, and becoming the first wild card to reach the semifinals. Zheng's win against Ivanovic in the third round also made her the lowest-ranked player (ranked as the world No. 133) to defeat a reigning world No. 1. This record would be broken only two months later by Julie Coin at the 2008 US Open, who also defeated Ivanovic.

Seeds

  Ana Ivanovic (third round)
  Jelena Janković (fourth round)
  Maria Sharapova (second round)
  Svetlana Kuznetsova (fourth round)
  Elena Dementieva (semifinals)
  Serena Williams (final)
  Venus Williams (champion)
  Anna Chakvetadze (fourth round)
  Dinara Safina (third round)
  Daniela Hantuchová (second round)
  Marion Bartoli (third round)
  Patty Schnyder (first round)
  Vera Zvonareva (second round)
  Agnieszka Radwańska (quarterfinals)
  Ágnes Szávay (fourth round)
  Victoria Azarenka (third round)

  Alizé Cornet (first round)
  Nicole Vaidišová (quarterfinals)
  Maria Kirilenko (first round)
  Francesca Schiavone (second round)
  Nadia Petrova (quarterfinals)
  Flavia Pennetta (second round)
  Katarina Srebotnik (first round)
  Shahar Pe'er (fourth round)
  Lindsay Davenport (second round, withdrew due to a knee injury)
  Sybille Bammer (second round)
  Virginie Razzano (first round)
  Alona Bondarenko (second round, retired due to a right leg injury)
  Amélie Mauresmo (third round)
  Dominika Cibulková (first round)
  Caroline Wozniacki (third round)
  Sania Mirza (second round)

Qualifying

Draw

Finals

Top half

Section 1

Section 2

Section 3

Section 4

Bottom half

Section 5

Section 6

Section 7

Section 8

Championship match statistics

References

External links

2008 Wimbledon Championships on WTAtennis.com
2008 Wimbledon Championships – Women's draws and results at the International Tennis Federation

Women's Singles
Wimbledon Championship by year – Women's singles
Wimbledon Championships
Wimbledon Championships